Terence Christopher Cave  (born 1 December 1938) is a British literary scholar.

Life 

Terence Cave studied for his Bachelor of Arts and Doctor of Philosophy degrees at Gonville and Caius College, Cambridge. Cave began his academic career in 1962 as an assistant lecturer at the University of St Andrews and went from there 1965 to the University of Warwick. Cave became Fellow and a Tutor in French at St John's College, Oxford, in 1972, and between 1989 and 2001 was also professor of French literature at the University of Oxford. In 1985 he was elected to become Drapers Professor of French at Cambridge, but remained at Oxford instead of taking the chair.

Among Cave's principal works are The Cornucopian Text (1979), Recognitions: A Study in Poetics (1988), and (edited with Sarah Kay and Malcolm Bowie) A Short History of French Literature (2003).

Cave is a member of the Academia Europaea (1990), fellow of the British Academy (1991), member of the Royal Norwegian Society of Sciences and Letters (1993), chevalier of the Ordre national du Mérite (2001), was made honorary doctor of the University of London in 2007, and is a member of the Norwegian Academy of Sciences. He gave the 2004 Master-Mind Lecture. In 2009 he received the Balzan Prize and in the 2013 Birthday Honours  was appointed CBE. Cave has held positions as a guest professor at national and international universities.

Works (selection) 
  Devotional Poetry in France 1570-1613. Cambridge: University Press, 1969
  The Cornucopian Text: Problems of Writing in the French Renaissance. Oxford: Clarendon Press, 1979.
  Cornucopia. Figures de l'abondance au XVIe siècle. Érasme, Rabelais, Ronsard, Montaigne. Ginette Morel in Romanian. Paris: Macula, 1997
  Recognitions: A Study in Poetics. Oxford: Clarendon Press, 1988
  Pré-histoires: textes troublés au seuil de la modernité. Geneva: Droz, 1999
  Pré-histoires II: langues étrangères et troubles économiques au XVIe siècle. Geneva: Droz, 2001
  How to Read Montaigne. London: Granta, 2007.
 With Sarah Kay and Malcolm Bowie:  A Short History of French Literature, Oxford 2003
 Edited by Neil Kenny and Wes Williams:  Retrospectives: Essays in Literature, Poetics and Cultural History. Oxford: Legenda, 2009. 
  Mignon's Afterlives. Oxford University Press, Oxford 2011. 
 Thinking with Literature: Towards a Cognitive Criticism 2017

References

External links 
 
 Terence Cave, at Balzan Prize, 2009

1938 births
Living people
Scholars of French literature
Commanders of the Order of the British Empire
Fellows of St John's College, Oxford
Knights of the Ordre national du Mérite
Members of Academia Europaea
Fellows of the British Academy
Members of the Norwegian Academy of Science and Letters